Rudolfiella, abbreviated as Rud. in the horticultural trade, is a genus of orchids comprising eight species native to tropical South America, Trinidad and Panama.

They are found in northern Brazil, Colombia, Ecuador, French Guiana, Guyana, Panamá, Peru, Suriname, Trinidad-Tobago and Venezuela.

The genus name of Rudolfiella is in honour of Friedrich Richard Rudolf Schlechter (1872–1925), who was a German taxonomist, botanist, and author of several works on orchids.

Species
 Rudolfiella aurantiaca 
 Rudolfiella bicornaria 
 Rudolfiella caquetaense 
 Rudolfiella floribunda 
 Rudolfiella lindmaniana 
 Rudolfiella peruviana 
 Rudolfiella picta

References

External links 

 
Maxillariinae genera
Flora of Panama
Flora of northern South America
Flora of western South America
Flora of North Brazil